Old Down is a hamlet in South Gloucestershire, near the larger villages of Olveston and Tockington and a mile west of Alveston. A tourist attraction called Old Down Country Park now occupies the country house in the village, and there is also a pub, The Fox, as well as several sporting facilities (a cricket club, football pitch and a bowling green).

External links

Villages in South Gloucestershire District